Djezzy (Arabic: جازي) is one of Algeria's three main mobile network operators, with a market share of 65% (over 16.49 million subscribers in December 2016) and a network covering 90% of the population (48 wilayas). Djezzy is wholly owned by the Algerian state since 2022, previously was a subsidiary of the Egyptian company Global Telecom Holding (a subsidiary of VEON). Djezzy acquired Algeria's second GSM license on 11 July 2001, with a bid of $737 million, and was officially launched on February 15, 2002.  

In January 2015, the National Investment Fund (FNI) took control of 51% of the capital of the company while the foreign partner, Global Telecom Holding, retained responsibility for the management of the company. In August 2022, VEON sold the remaining 45.57% stake in the company to the National Investment Fund for $682 million, making it the sole owner of Djezzy.

Djezzy covers 95% of the population across the national territory and its 3G services are deployed in 48 wilayas. Djezzy launched its 4G services, on October 1, 2016, in 20 wilayas and is committed to covering more than 50% of the population by 2021.

Djezzy is engaged in a process of transformation to become the leading digital operator in Algeria and allow customers to navigate the digital world. The company is headed by Vincenzo Nesci Executive Chairman and Matthieu Galvani, Chief Executive Officer.

Djezzy was part of VEON, an international communications and technology company.

The company provides a wide range of services such as the prepaid, post-paid, data, value-added services and SUT. 

It has two competitors: the government-owned Mobilis and the privately owned Ooredoo Algeria.

Logos

References

External links
 "Official site"
 "Alcatel & Orascom"
 "Bloomberg Profile"

Algerian brands
Companies based in Algiers
Telecommunications companies established in 2001
Internet service providers of Algeria
Telecommunications companies of Algeria
Orascom Group
VEON